The Anse Maranda Formation is a geologic formation in the Quebec Appalachians. It preserves fossils dating back to the early Cambrian period.

See also
 List of fossiliferous stratigraphic units in Quebec

References

 

Cambrian Canada
Cambrian southern paleotemperate deposits